Novotný or Novotny may refer to:

 Novotny (chess), a device found in some chess problems
 Novotny (surname), people with the surname Novotny

See also
 
 Nowotny